Sitting Ducks is a 1980 American comedy film directed by Henry Jaglom. The film follows the adventures of two small-time hoods (Zack Norman and Michael Emil, Jaglom’s real-life brother) who steal a considerable amount of cash from a gambling syndicate. While fleeing by car down the U.S. eastern seaboard for a chartered airplane that will take them to Central America, they pick up a pair of vivacious young ladies and an unsuccessful singer-songwriter.

The film competed in the Un Certain Regard section at the 1980 Cannes Film Festival.

Cast
 Michael Emil - Simon
 Zack Norman - Sidney
 Patrice Townsend - Jenny
 Irene Forrest - Leona
 Richard Romanus - Moose
 John Teranova - Mr. Carmichael
 Eric Starr - Gas Station Attendant
 Stasia Grabowski - Collector #1
 Ellen Talmadge - Collector #2
 Madeline Silver - Secretary (as Madeline N. Silver)
 Yoram Kaniur - Collector #3
 Judith Bruce - Head Waitress

References

External links

1980 films
1980 comedy films
American comedy films
Films directed by Henry Jaglom
1980s English-language films
1980s American films